Hiroki Nakazawa (仲澤 広基, born January 22, 1987) is a Japanese professional baseball infielder for the Tohoku Rakuten Golden Eagles in Japan's Nippon Professional Baseball. He previously played with the Yomiuri Giants.

External links

NPB.com

1987 births
Living people
Baseball people from Yamanashi Prefecture
Japanese baseball players
Nippon Professional Baseball infielders
Yomiuri Giants players
Tohoku Rakuten Golden Eagles players